was a Japanese astrophysicist and a member of the Japan Academy.  He was professor emeritus at the University of Tokyo and Institute of Space and Astronautical Science (ISAS) (part of JAXA) in Kanagawa, Japan and guest scientist at the Max Planck Institute for Extraterrestrial Physics in Garching, Germany.

He was a pioneer in X-ray astronomy, leading the development and operation of the Ginga, Tenma, and ASCA satellites. He died on 18 January 2018.

Awards and honors
Awards
 (1989)
Imperial Prize of the Japan Academy (1993)
James Craig Watson Medal (1994)
Foreign Associate, National Academy of Sciences (1998)
Bruno Rossi Prize (2001)
Person of Cultural Merit (2011)
Named after him
Asteroid 4387 Tanaka
Other
Foreign member of the Royal Netherlands Academy of Arts and Sciences (1989)
The American Astronomical Society named him an Honorary Member (2012)

References

1931 births
2018 deaths
20th-century Japanese astronomers
Members of the Royal Netherlands Academy of Arts and Sciences
Foreign associates of the National Academy of Sciences
Laureates of the Imperial Prize
Osaka University alumni
Academic staff of the University of Tokyo
Academic staff of Nagoya University
Japanese astrophysicists
People from Osaka